They Call Me Jeeg is a 2015 Italian superhero film directed by Gabriele Mainetti and starring Claudio Santamaria in the lead role. The plot concerns a lonely misanthropic crook named Enzo, who gets superhuman strength after being affected by radioactive waste in the Tiber waters.

The film is a tribute to the anime and manga series Steel Jeeg (Jeeg robot d'acciaio in Italy, where it is very popular) by Gō Nagai, from which takes up some thematics; the title is an in-joke based on the Alessia character who believes that the hero of the anime, Hiroshi Shiba, exists in the real world, and she mistakes Enzo for him. The title is also a reference to the spaghetti western film They Call Me Trinity (Lo chiamavano Trinità).

It received largely positive critical reviews and was nominated for several film industry awards, including seventeen David di Donatello, winning eight. The film was also one of seven films on a shortlist to be selected as the Italian entry for the Academy Award for Best Foreign Language Film at the 89th Academy Awards, but the film Fuocoammare was chosen instead.

After a successful run in Italian theaters in 2016, the movie got a limited release in the U.S. starting 17 March 2017 by Uncork'd Entertainment.

Plot 
Enzo Ceccotti is a thief who lives in Rome's slum Tor Bella Monaca. After stealing a wristwatch, Enzo escapes two police officers by jumping into the Tiber. When Enzo tries to get out, he comes into contact with radioactive waste after he accidentally breaks a barrel under the river level. Spending a night feverish and vomiting, he wakes up healed but with a persistent cough.

Enzo decides to sell the watch to Sergio, who works for Fabio Cannizzaro, known as "The Gipsy", a psychopathic gangster who hungers for fame. Sergio takes him on a job which is supposed to involve extracting cocaine from inside a pair of drug mule brothers. At Sergio's home, Enzo meets his daughter Alessia, a psychologically damaged woman who escapes reality by continuously watching the Steel Jeeg anime and relating everything to it. After arriving with the drug smugglers at the top of a building under construction, one of them dies from an overdose when the container in his stomach breaks. Sergio refuses to take him to hospital, so the man's brother grabs Sergio's gun and shoots him. Sergio, before dying, bashes the man's head against a pillar. The man then shoots Enzo in the shoulder, knocking him backwards off the building; miraculously, Enzo survives.

At home, Enzo discovers he has acquired exceptional strength, the reason for his healing ability. That night, he steals an entire ATM and is filmed by a security camera; the surveillance video goes viral, and the press calls Enzo a super-criminal, although no one knows his true identity. Gipsy discovers that Sergio has not returned with the cocaine, which the gang bought from a camorra clan led by Nunzia Lo Cosimo, a terrorist. Gipsy must retrieve the cocaine or pay Nunzia off, so he and his gang invade Sergio's place, finding only Alessia. Enzo rescues her by crushing Gipsy's posse, and Alessia mistakes him for Hiroshi Shiba, the hero of Steel Jeeg.

Enzo, who wishes to live in solitude, takes Alessia to a residential care home, where she previously stayed while her father was imprisoned. Finding information hidden in Sergio's spectacle case, Enzo robs the valuable contents of the same armored truck that Gipsy and his gang are about to assault. This increases Enzo's infamy, making Gipsy jealous. Shortly thereafter, two police officers bring Alessia to Enzo after they find her wandering in the highway, and he takes her in. That night, as they watch a Steel Jeeg episode, Alessia experiences an emotional breakdown, revealing that she suffered sexual abuse.

Gipsy's gang crumbles as his gang questions his leadership, and Gipsy orders his rottweilers to maul a gangster who suggests taking a loan. However, with no other options, Gipsy contacts Brazilian transsexual loanshark Marcellone, only to be attacked by Nunzia and her gang; in the ensuing clash, only Gipsy and Nunzia survive.

Enzo initiates a sexual encounter, which Alessia passively submits to after asking him to slow down. During an argument immediately afterwards, Enzo reveals the truth about her father's death. Alessia flees in anger and boards a tram. Enzo stops it with his superhuman strength and apologizes, telling Alessia he cares about her and offering to go with her to see her father's body. The passengers film this, and Gipsy discovers Enzo's identity. He and his assistant, Tazzina, kidnap Alessia to force Enzo into revealing how he obtained his powers. Enzo takes him to the Tiber quay, where Nunzia attacks. Alessia is shot and asks Enzo to use his powers for good before she dies. Gipsy is shot multiple times, then burned alive by Nunzia with a flamethrower and apparently dies in the Tiber. The next day, he emerges from the river, scarred and burned but with superpowers like Enzo. He goes to Naples and films himself as he kills Nunzia and her gang.

While wandering alone, Enzo saves a woman and her daughter from a burning car. Enzo sees a video on television where Gipsy threatens to bomb the Stadio Olimpico. Enzo finds and confronts Gipsy but is unable to defuse the bomb. Enzo grabs it and jumps into the Tiber from the Musica-Armando Trovajoli bridge with Gipsy, who is killed in the explosion. Enzo, now thought dead and exalted as a hero, watches over Rome from the Colosseum and, determined to protect the city, puts on a Jeeg mask Alessia knitted for him.

Cast  
 Claudio Santamaria as Enzo Ceccotti / "Jeeg"
 Luca Marinelli as Fabio Cannizzaro / The Gipsy
 Ilenia Pastorelli as Alessia
 Stefano Ambrogi as Sergio 
 Maurizio Tesei as Biondo
 Francesco Formichetti as Sperma
 Daniele Trombetti as Tazzina
 Antonia Truppo as Nunzia
 Gianluca Di Gennaro as Antonio
 Salvatore Esposito as Vincenzo

Reception
They Call Me Jeeg received positive reviews from critics, who praised Santamaria, Marinelli, and Pastorelli's performances, the screenplay, and the "township" setting. MoviePlayer gave the film 3.5 stars out of 5, calling it "a triumph of pure cinema, writing, acting, ability to stage and productive obstinacy". Film critic  called it "a masterpiece, to watch at all costs [...] full of fun", praising Santamaria, Marinelli, and Pastorelli's performances. Jay Weissberg from Variety praised the film, calling it "surprisingly gritty and thoroughly enjoyable".

Awards and nominations

Legacy 
A comic book based on the film, produced by Lucky Red and La Gazzetta dello Sport, was published in 2016. The comic book is written by Roberto Recchioni, drawn by Giorgio Pontrelli and Stefano Simeone, and with the cover arts by Giacomo Bevilacqua, Leo Ortolani and Zerocalcare, and it takes place after the events of the movie.

Malayalam movie Minnal Murali is inspired by the film.

See also  
 List of Italian films of 2015

References

External links
 

2015 films
2015 comedy-drama films
2010s superhero films
Italian comedy-drama films
Italian science fiction comedy films
Italian superhero films
2010s science fiction comedy films